Opah Clement Tukumbuke Sanga (born 14 February 2001) is a Tanzanian professional footballer who plays as a forward for Simba Queens(the female football club of Simba sports club tanzania) and the Tanzania women's national team.

International career 
Clement has capped for the Tanzania under-20 team. Clement made his debut his competitive debut for the Tanzania national team during the 2020 COSAFA Women's Championship.

Honours 

 COSAFA Women's Championship: 2021

References

External links 
 
 

2001 births
Living people
Tanzanian women's footballers
Women's association football forwards
Tanzania women's international footballers
Tanzanian expatriate footballers
Tanzanian expatriate sportspeople in Turkey
Expatriate women's footballers in Turkey
Kayseri Women's footballers